"Catch Me (I'm Falling)" is a song released by American group Pretty Poison in 1987. It was included on the soundtrack to the film Hiding Out, which starred Jon Cryer and came out the same year; the song later appeared on Pretty Poison's debut album of the same name. It was the group's biggest hit single to date, peaking at number one on the Billboard Hot Dance Club Play chart in late September 1987. Later that same year, the song charted inside the top ten of the Billboard Hot 100 chart, peaking at number eight and remaining in the top 40 for 14 weeks. The single was certified gold by the RIAA on March 9, 1989. In the UK the song entered the Top 100 for two weeks at the end of January 1988 and peaked at number 85.

Charts

Year-end charts

Popular culture
This song is featured in the movies Kickin' It Old Skool and The Big Sick.
This song is featured in the seventh episode of the fourth season of TV series Breaking Bad.
In 2009, VH1 ranked "Catch Me (I'm Falling)" number 47 on its program 100 Greatest One-Hit Wonders of the '80s.
RuPaul lip syncs to the song in an episode of his new Netflix series AJ and The Queen.
An interpolation of "Catch Me (I'm Falling)" was used on Joss Stone's song "Proper Nice", taken from her 2007 album Introducing Joss Stone.
This song is featured in the Netflix series Dahmer – Monster: The Jeffrey Dahmer Story as Jeffrey falls under the influence of drugs.

References

1987 songs
1987 singles
Music videos directed by Bob Giraldi
Songs written for films
Virgin Records singles